"Des mots qui sonnent" may refer to:
Dion chante Plamondon, 1991 album by Celine Dion, which was released under the title Des mots qui sonnent in Europe, in 1992
"Des mots qui sonnent" (song), 1991 single from the album